Bellevue station, otherwise known as the Burlington Depot in Bellevue, Nebraska is a historic railroad station which served trains of the Chicago, Burlington and Quincy Railroad (Burlington Route). The depot was originally built in 1869 for the Omaha and South Western Railroad, making it the oldest surviving depot in Nebraska.

In 1940, the station had daily mixed train service to Omaha or Ashland. This service lasted at least until 1951, but was gone by 1965.

The station was listed on the National Register of Historic Places on October 16, 1970. After the depot was relocated from the railroad tracks to a local park, it was removed from the NRHP on April 13, 1987. Today, the depot is part of the Sarpy County Museum.

References 

Railway stations in the United States opened in 1869
National Register of Historic Places in Sarpy County, Nebraska
Railway stations on the National Register of Historic Places in Nebraska
Former Chicago, Burlington and Quincy Railroad stations
1869 establishments in Nebraska
Former railway stations in Nebraska
Former National Register of Historic Places in Nebraska